Brachycerus sacer is a species of family Curculionidae, subfamily Brachycerinae.  It was described by Pierre André Latreille in 1827.

References 

Brachycerinae